Saint-Didace is a parish municipality in the D'Autray Regional County Municipality in the Lanaudière region of Quebec, Canada.

Demographics 

Mother tongue:
 English as first language: 0%
 French as first language: 98.5%
 English and French as first language: 0%
 Other as first language: 1.5%

Education
Commission scolaire des Samares operates Francophone schools:
 École Germain-Caron

See also
List of parish municipalities in Quebec

References

External links

Saint-Didace - MRC d'Autray

Incorporated places in Lanaudière
Parish municipalities in Quebec